Adriska is a lake of Estonia.

See also
 List of lakes of Estonia

Lakes of Estonia